Beers is a surname. Notable people with the surname include:

Adrian Beers (1916–2004), British double bass player
Betsy Beers (born 1957), American television and film producer
Clifford Whittingham Beers (1876–1943), founder of the mental hygiene movement
Cyrus Beers (1786–1850), U.S. Congressman from New York
David Beers (born 1957), Canadian journalist
David T. Beers, U.S. financial analyst
Edward M. Beers (1877–1932), U.S. Congressman from Pennsylvania
Ed Beers (b. 1959), retired National Hockey League player
Garry Gary Beers (born 1957), Australian musician and former member of INXS
George D. Beers (1812–1880), New York politician
Henry Augustin Beers (1847-1926) U.S. author, literary historian, poet, and professor
Julie Hart Beers (1835–1913), American painter
Rand Beers (b. 1942), American counterterrorism expert
Thom Beers, television producer and voiceover artist
William George Beers, known as the father of modern lacrosse

See also
Beer (surname)
De Beers

Surnames from nicknames